Bushton is an English hamlet about  south of Royal Wootton Bassett in Wiltshire. It belongs to the civil parish of Clyffe Pypard.

History
In 1086, the Domesday Book recorded an estate at Bushton, held by the Bishop of Winchester. By the 17th century the manor of Bushton had become a tithing of Clyffe Pypard parish.

Manor Farmhouse is a Georgian house of five bays built of brick with stone trim in the early 18th century.

Woodhill Park, near Bushton, is a Georgian country house built in the 18th century. Richard Pace added the south-east range in 1804.

Notable residents
The pamphleteer and poet Ralph Broome (1742–1835) was born and raised in the hamlet. Also born at Bushton was the Jesuit missionary to India Thomas Stephens (c. 1549–1619).

Amenities
The parish's village hall is at Bushton.

Bushton's public house, the Trotting Horse, closed down in 2016 for conversion into a residence.

References

External links

Hamlets in Wiltshire